Jaan Tagel (1886 Vastseliina Parish (now Võru Parish), Kreis Werro – ?) was an Estonian politician. He was a member of II Riigikogu. He was a member of the Riigikogu since 8 March 1924. He replaced Aleksander Reinson. On 22 March 1924, he resigned his position and he was replaced by Eduard Kingsepp.

References

1886 births
Year of death missing
People from Võru Parish
People from Kreis Werro
Workers' United Front politicians
Members of the Riigikogu, 1923–1926